Acanthiophilus walkeri is a species of tephritid or fruit flies in the genus Acanthiophilus of the family Tephritidae.

Distribution
Madeira Island, Canary Island.

References

Tephritinae
Insects described in 1858
Diptera of Africa